The central pebble-mound mouse (Pseudomys johnsoni) is a species of rodent in the family Muridae, native to Australia. The Kimberley mouse (Pseudomys laborifex) was, until recently, considered distinct from P. johnsoni, but they are now known to be conspecific. It is one of the pebble-mound mice.

References

 Baillie, J. 1996.  Pseudomys johnsoni.   2006 IUCN Red List of Threatened Species.   Downloaded on 19 July 2007.
Musser, G. G. and M. D. Carleton. 2005. Superfamily Muroidea. pp. 894–1531 in Mammal Species of the World a Taxonomic and Geographic Reference. D. E. Wilson and D. M. Reeder eds. Johns Hopkins University Press, Baltimore.

Pseudomys
Mammals of the Northern Territory
Rodents of Australia
Mammals described in 1985